St. Mary's College, Sulthan Bathery is a Post Graduate Aided College managed by the Malankara Orthodox Syrian Church of the East is located in Sulthan Bathery, Wayanad district, Kerala. It was established in the year 1965. St. Mary's College is the first higher education College in Wayanad. The college is affiliated to the University of Calicut. The college was NAAC accredited with B plus in 2006. In the year 2012, it is re-accredited with A grade by the NAAC. The college offers 11 under graduate and 8 post graduate courses. It has a campus strength of 1622+ students and teaching staff of 88+. It has a campus area of 50 Acres.

History
Fr. Mathai Nooranal (1928-2002) played the pivotal role in the establishment of college by putting forward all efforts.
The college was formally inaugurated on 1 July 1965 by Rev. Fr. Mathai Nooranal, the founder Chairman of the Governing Board at a meeting presided over by Late Sri. M. C. Pothen (Manamel), founder Secretary of the governing Board.
Sri. K. M. Cherian (Kandathil) and Sri. K. M. Mathew (Kandathil), both Chief Editors of Malayala Manorama were pillars of strength for Fr. Mathai Nooranal during the foundation of the college as well during the significant years of its development.

Accreditation
The college is  recognized by the University Grants Commission (UGC).
NAAC with A Grade

See also

References

External links

University of Calicut
University Grants Commission
National Assessment and Accreditation Council

Universities and colleges in Wayanad district
Educational institutions established in 1965
1965 establishments in Kerala

Arts and Science colleges in Kerala
Colleges affiliated with the University of Calicut